Events in the year 1901 in Japan. It corresponds to Meiji 34 (明治34年) in the Japanese calendar.

Incumbents
Emperor: Emperor Meiji
Prime Minister:
Itō Hirobumi: until May 10
Saionji Kinmochi: (Acting) May 10 – June 2
Katsura Tarō: from June 2

Governors
Aichi Prefecture: Mori Mamoru
Akita Prefecture: Takeda Chiyosaburo
Aomori Prefecture: Munakata Tadashi then Ichiji Yamanouchi
Ehime Prefecture: Tai Neijro
Fukui Prefecture: Saburo Iwao then Munakata Tadashi
Fukushima Prefecture: Arita Yoshisuke
Gifu Prefecture: Kawaji Toshikyo
Gunma Prefecture: Furusho Kamon then Nobuchika Ogura
Hiroshima Prefecture: Asada Tokunori
Ibaraki Prefecture: Chuzo Kono 
Iwate Prefecture: Ganri Hojo 
Kagawa Prefecture: Naokata Suehiro
Kochi Prefecture: Kinyuu Watanabe 
Kumamoto Prefecture: Tokuhisa Tsunenori then Egi Kazuyuki
Kyoto Prefecture: Baron Shoichi Omori
Mie Prefecture: Kamon Furusha
Miyagi Prefecture: Motohiro Onoda then Tadashi Munakata
Miyazaki Prefecture: Sukeo Kabawaya then Isamu Sonowaya 
Nagano Prefecture: Oshikawa Sokkichi then Seki Kiyohide  
Niigata Prefecture: Oshikawa Sokkichi
Oita Prefecture: Marques Okubo Toshi Takeshi  
Okinawa Prefecture: Shigeru Narahara
Osaka Prefecture: Tadashini Kikuchi
Saga Prefecture: Seki Kiyohide then Fai Kagawa
Saitama Prefecture: Marquis Okubo Toshi Takeshi
Shiga Prefecture: Sada Suzuki
Shiname Prefecture: Matsunaga Takeyoshi
Tochigi Prefecture: Korechika 
Tokushima Prefecture: Saburo Iwao
Tokyo: Baron Sangay Takatomi
Toyama Prefecture: Higaki Naosuke
Yamagata Prefecture: Baron Seki Yoshiomi

Events
February 5 –  Japan fires up the furnace at its first modern ironworks.
April 20 – Japan Women's University is established.
September 7 – The Boxer Protocol is signed between the Qing Empire of China and the Eight-Nation Alliance. Japan is represented by the Minister for Foreign Affairs Komura Jutarō.
Unknown date – Imabari Shipbuilding was founded, as predecessor name was Higaki Shipbuilding in Ehime Prefecture.

Births
February 15 – Minoru Inuzuka, film director and screenwriter (2007)
February 16 – Koji Shima,  film director, actor, and screenwriter (1986)
February 17 – Motojirō Kajii, writer (d. 1932)
March 10 – Mushitaro Oguri, novelist (1946)
March 27 – Eisaku Satō, Prime Minister of Japan, recipient of the Nobel Peace Prize (d. 1975)
April 19 – Kiyoshi Oka, mathematician (d. 1978)
April 29
Hotsumi Ozaki, journalist and soviet spy (d. 1944)
Hirohito, 124th Emperor of Japan (d. 1989)
June 21 – Mitsuko Yoshikawa, FILM actress (d. 1991)
July 10 – Eiji Tsuburaya, Japanese film director and special effects designer (d. 1970)
September 9 – Hideo Oguma, poet (d. 1940)
November 4 – Princess Masako Nashimoto, consort of Crown Prince Euimin of Korea (d. 1989)
November 5 – Chōgorō Kaionji, writer (1976)
December 12 – Ihei Kimura, photographer (d. 1974)

Deaths
January 20 – Keisuke Ito, physician and biologist (b. 1803)
February 3 – Fukuzawa Yukichi, writer and educator (b. 1835)
March 29 – Ōshima Takatō, engineer (b. 1826)
June 6 – Oda Nobutoshi, former daimyō (b. 1853)
June 21 – Hoshi Tōru, politician and cabinet minister (b. 1850)
August 19 – Shō Tai, last king of the Ryukyu Kingdom (b. 1843)
December 13 – Nakae Chōmin, philosopher and journalist (b. 1847)

References

 
1900s in Japan
Japan
Years of the 20th century in Japan